The final of the Men's 50 km Race Walking event at the 2003 Pan American Games took place on Friday August 8, 2003. Only five men finished the race.

Medalists

Records

Results

See also
2003 Race Walking Year Ranking
2003 World Championships in Athletics – Men's 50 kilometres walk
Athletics at the 2004 Summer Olympics – Men's 50 kilometre walk

References
Results

Walk, Men's 50
2003